Asteras Itea Football Club is a Greek football club based in Itea, Phocis, Greece.

Honours

Domestic

 Phocis FCA Champions: 13
 1985–86, 1988–89, 1992–93, 1994–95, 1996–97, 1999–2000, 2002–03, 2004–05, 2006–07, 2012–13, 2013–14, 2015–16, 2016–17
 Phocis FCA Cup Winners: 12
 1985–86, 1987–88, 1992–93, 1995–96, 1996–97, 1997–98, 1998–99, 2001–02, 2007–08, 2008–09, 2013–14, 2018–19

References

Phocis
Association football clubs established in 1936
1936 establishments in Greece
Gamma Ethniki clubs